Uxeau is a commune in the Saône-et-Loire department in the region of Bourgogne-Franche-Comté in eastern France.  Uxeau is located in the south west of Saône et Loire at 150 km from Dijon and in the middle of the way between Dijon and Clermont-Ferrand. Uxeau is located in the canton of Gueugnon, a small industrial town. Many of the inhabitants of Uxeau work or have worked on the steel works of Aperam in Gueugnon.
The summit of the Mont Dardon is in the commune of Uxeau. The Mont Dardon is located on the Communes of Uxeau, Sainte-Radegonde and Issy-l'Évêque.

See also
 Communes of the Saône-et-Loire department

References

Communes of Saône-et-Loire